Live Lines is the first live DVD from German futurepop band Blutengel. It was released as a DVD and a limited edition featuring a CD version of Live Lines.

Track listing

References

Blutengel albums
2005 live albums
2005 video albums
Live video albums